Regny  is a village in the administrative district of Gmina Koluszki, within Łódź East County, Łódź Voivodeship, in central Poland.

The village has a population of 530.

References

Villages in Łódź East County